Penicillium subtile is a species of fungus in the genus Penicillium.

References

subtile
Fungi described in 1841
Taxa named by Miles Joseph Berkeley